
Gmina Lipce Reymontowskie is a rural gmina (administrative district) in Skierniewice County, Łódź Voivodeship, in central Poland.

Villages
Gmina Lipce Reymontowskie contains the villages and settlements of Chlebów, Drzewce, Lipce Reymontowskie, Mszadla, Retniowiec, Siciska, Wola Drzewiecka, Wólka Krosnowska and Wólka Podlesie.

Neighbouring gminas
Gmina Lipce Reymontowskie is bordered by the gminas of Dmosin, Godzianów, Łyszkowice, Maków, Rogów and Słupia.

References
Polish official population figures 2006

Lipce Reymontowskie
Skierniewice County